Tylopsis is a genus of bush crickets in the subfamily Phaneropterinae and the monotypic tribe Tylopsidini.  Species are found in mainland Europe, the Middle East and Africa.

Species

 Tylopsis ampla Ragge, 1964
 Tylopsis bilineolata (Serville, 1838)
 Tylopsis brevis Ragge, 1964
 Tylopsis coi Jannone, 1936
 Tylopsis continua (Walker, F., 1869)
 Tylopsis dispar Sjöstedt, 1909
 Tylopsis farrowi Ragge, 1972
 Tylopsis fissa Ragge, 1964
 Tylopsis gracilis Chopard, 1954
 Tylopsis irregularis Karsch, 1893
 Tylopsis lilifolia (Fabricius, 1793)
 Tylopsis peneri Ragge, 1974
 Tylopsis punctulata Kirby, W.F., 1900
 Tylopsis rubrescens Kirby, W.F., 1900

References

Phaneropterinae
Tettigoniidae genera